Genevieve Segerblom (née Wines; March 15, 1918 – January 4, 2013) was an American politician who served as a member of the Nevada Assembly from 1992 to 2000.

Early life and education 
Segerblom was born in Ruby Valley, Nevada. She earned a Bachelor of Arts degree from the University of Nevada, Reno.

Career 
Segerblom worked as a teacher in Nevada where she arrived in 1940 and married Cliff Segerblom one year later. The Segerblom family were heavily involved in Nevada politics and can be traced back between 1906 and 1914 when they were first involved. Segerblom later served as a member of the Boulder City Council.

Personal life 
Genevieve Segerblom died, aged 94, in Boulder City, Nevada, survived by her daughter and son, Robin and Tick Segerblom.

References

External links
A Guide to the Genevieve Segerblom Papers, 95-03. Special Collections, University Libraries, University of Nevada, Reno.

1918 births
2013 deaths
People from Humboldt County, Nevada
People from Boulder City, Nevada
University of Nevada alumni
Nevada city council members
Women state legislators in Nevada
Members of the Nevada Assembly
Women city councillors in Nevada
21st-century American women